Chilaw Marians Cricket Club are a first-class cricket team based in Chilaw, Sri Lanka. They play their home games at FTZ Sports Complex. The club has won the Premier League one day Tournament in 2005. More successful in limited overs cricket, Chilaw reached the final of the International 20:20 Club Championship in 2005.

History
Chilaw Marians Cricket Club was founded in 1975 under the guidance of Rev. Brother Edwin Ambross who at the time was the Principal of St Mary’s College, Chilaw, together with a group of cricket loving enthusiasts, namely Shanthi Seneviratne, Edward Gamini, Dinesh Fernando, Rohan Fernandopulle and Bertram Navaratne. Starting at the lowest divisions of club cricket in the 1980s, Chilaw Marians CC progressed through the ranks to reach BCCSL Division III.

In the mid-1990s under the leadership of Irwin Fernando and Godfrey Dabrera, the committee formulated plans to take the club to the next level of club cricket – BCCSL Division II. In 1998 Chilaw Marians was able to secure their first title, becoming BCCSL Under 23 Division II Champions. Encouraged and energised by this achievement, the club set its sights on the pinnacle of 1st class cricket in Sri Lanka – Division I. In the year 2000 Chilaw Marians won the Premier Division I Qualifying Championship and were promoted to the highest level of club cricket in Sri Lanka.

Current squad
Players with international caps are listed in bold. Updated as of 23 July 2022

See also
 List of Chilaw Marians Cricket Club players

References

External links
 Chilaw Marians at CricketArchive
 Cricinfo
 

Sri Lankan first-class cricket teams